Claude Patterson (born July 8, 1941) is an American retired professional wrestler, ring name Thunderbolt Patterson. He began his career in 1964 and wrestled primarily in Florida, Georgia and the Carolinas. During the early 1970s, he was blacklisted by the National Wrestling Alliance for repeated appearances with independent promotions, complaints of institutional racism and attempts to form a wrestlers' labor union.

Professional wrestling career
Patterson had grown up in Iowa and worked for John Deere in Waterloo, Iowa when he broke into professional wrestling in the Kansas City area. Promoter Gus Karras put Patterson in matches against Don Soto in 1964. In 1965, Patterson moved to Texas and worked with promoter Dory Funk Sr. The following year, he traveled to California, where he held the WWA Tag Team Championship with Alberto Torres. He also continued to work in Texas, where he worked as a villainous character in Dallas until he was turned on by his partner Boris Malenko. Fritz Von Erich had a Russian chain match with Malenko for Patterson's contract which Malenko owned.

In 1969, he worked for Big Time Wrestling in Michigan and Ohio.

In 1970, he feuded with Jose Lothario and held the Florida version of the NWA Brass Knuckles Championship.

Patterson agreed to work for an outlaw promotion (that is, one outside of the NWA) run by Ann Gunkel, the widow of his old friend and Georgia promoter Ray Gunkel, in January 1974. In January 1975, he moved to Big Time Wrestling in Detroit. In December 1975, he began to wrestle for the NWA promotion in Florida where he remained until April 1976. In 1976, he won the NWA Florida Heavyweight Championship from Bruiser Brody. In 1977, he scored a surprise pinfall win over The Sheik in Toronto for the U.S. title but lost three weeks later. He then switched to Georgia Championship Wrestling where he remained until 1980. 

He spoke out against poor working conditions for wrestlers in the 1970s and participated in a racial discrimination lawsuit. He has claimed that as a result, he was blacklisted from wrestling in the mid-1970s. He had been complaining about racism from promoters for many years (he would later recall that only Dory Funk Sr. had backed him) and wanted to start a wrestlers' union, a dream he shared with former NFL player and wrestler Jim Wilson, himself blacklisted. He has said that it was years, with Patterson claiming to be working at the Los Angeles Times in the interim, before he has said his blacklisting was lifted, when Dusty Rhodes took ill in Florida in 1975.

Patterson joined Ole Anderson as a tag team partner in 1984 and they briefly held the NWA National Tag Team Championship. Ole's kayfabe nephew, a young Arn Anderson, came to the sport, and Ole, saying he was "tired of carrying guys like Patterson and Dusty Rhodes" broke up with Patterson, and joined Arn in what would be the foundation for the Four Horsemen which would include NWA Heavyweight Champion Ric Flair and Tully Blanchard.

Patterson retired from full time wrestling in 1985. He then appeared in the ring in 1993 at a "Legends Reunion Match" at Slamboree '93, where he teamed with Brad Armstrong to defeat Ivan Koloff and Baron von Raschke. He would also mentor Ice Train, until retiring completely in 1994.

On July 27, 2019, Patterson was inducted the 2019 Class of the George Tragos/Lou Thesz Professional Wrestling Hall of Fame in his hometown of Waterloo.

Patterson is regularly mentioned by commentators Kevin Kelly and Steve Corino on the Ring of Honor wrestling promotion's Ring of Honor Wrestling syndicated television show.

Personal life
In 1988, he was a labor organizer for Service Employees International Union in Atlanta.

After retiring from professional wrestling, he began running a Christian camp for children. Patterson is also an ordained minister.

Championships and accomplishments
Championship Wrestling from Florida
NWA Brass Knuckles Championship (Florida version) (1 time)
NWA Florida Heavyweight Championship (1 time)
Continental Wrestling Association
CWA World Heavyweight Championship (1 time)
  George Tragos/Lou Thesz Professional Wrestling Hall of Fame
Lou Thesz Award (2019) 
Georgia Championship Wrestling
NWA Georgia Tag Team Championship (3 times) - with Mr. Wrestling (1), Tommy Rich (1), and Tony Atlas (1)
NWA Georgia Television Championship (2 times)
NWA National Tag Team Championship (1 time) - with Ole Anderson
International Championship Wrestling
ICW United States Heavyweight Championship (1 time)
Maple Leaf Wrestling
NWA United States Heavyweight Championship (Toronto version) (1 time)
Mid-Atlantic Championship Wrestling
NWA Atlantic Coast Tag Team Championship (1 time) - with Jerry Brisco
NWA Big Time Wrestling
NWA American Tag Team Championship (4 times) - with  Wahoo McDaniel (2) Toru Tanaka (1), and Johnny Valentine (1)
NWA Tri-State
NWA Brass Knuckles Championship (Tri-State version) (1 time)
Western States Sports
NWA Brass Knuckles Championship (Amarillo version) (4 times)
World Wrestling Association
WWA World Tag Team Championship (1 time) - with Alberto Torres
Wrestling Observer Newsletter
 Worst on Interviews (1985)

References

External links
An interview with Thunderbolt Patterson
 

1941 births
20th-century African-American sportspeople
20th-century professional wrestlers
21st-century African-American people
African-American male professional wrestlers
American male professional wrestlers
Living people
Sportspeople from Atlanta
Sportspeople from Waterloo, Iowa
Professional wrestlers from Iowa
NWA Florida Heavyweight Champions
NWA Southern Heavyweight Champions (Florida version)
NWA Brass Knuckles Champions (Florida version)
NWA United States Heavyweight Champions (Toronto version)
NWA Americas Tag Team Champions
NWA Georgia Tag Team Champions
NWA National Tag Team Champions
NWA National Television Champions